NOLA Motorsports Park is a full service motorsports facility in Avondale, Louisiana approximately twenty minutes from downtown New Orleans. NOLA Motorsports Park includes an FIA Grade 2 road course, one of the largest (fully-lit) outdoor karting tracks in the country, and a 300,000 square ft. soft-grade asphalt skid pad, perfect for drifting and autocross.

The kart circuit and North Track opened in Q4 2011.

Future plans include completion of an off-roading area, a supercar driving experience, and more.

Design
NOLA Motorsports Park was designed by Alan Wilson, whose other designs include Utah Motorsports Campus and Barber Motorsports Park. In addition to the two international standard race tracks, the facility also features three karting tracks, full service seven acre kart center, paddock, on-site speed shop, clubhouse, eight acre autocross pad, and a state-of-the-art event center, perfect for business conferences, weddings, and other large events.

The park was designed with forward thinking electronic systems including over 100 miles of fiber optics and the latest timing and scoring equipment to allow for accurate timing on both the main and karting tracks.

Activities 
East of the main track is a short and thin track. Usually being divided up in the center, it serves its north side as the rental go-kart track. The south can be rented out and holds smaller events such as motorcycle races. Behind the track is a gift shop with racing memorabilia and a plethora of other items. The two-story building also houses two private balconies and an upstairs lobby with a small kitchen, which can be rented out for parties.

There is motorcycle safety training and on-track exotic car rentals provided by Xtreme Xperience. Housed at Nola Motorsports Park for rental are the Huracán LP610-4, the Ferrari 458 Italia, the Porsche 911 GT3, and the Slingshot SLR.

Competitive racing is also hosted at the park, with a Go-Kart League racing for 2 seasons a year. Autocross, hosted on the skidpad, and NASA racing as well.

Accidents 
In chronological order

On April 15, 2017, Jesus Martinez was riding an unspecified motorcycle on the east track about 8:30 p.m. when he inadvertently hit another rider and suffered life-threatening injuries. He later died of injuries shortly after getting an ambulance to University Medical Center. The accident was found to be a racing incident caused by rider error and no outside debris on the track was found.

On September 22, 2018, Jeff Hagaman was topping out his 2000 hp heavily modified 2010 Nissan GTR during a speed trials event laid out on a half-mile course utilising the pit straight of the circuit. He was in the shutdown area after finishing his half-mile run at speeds exceeding  during the run when he lost control of the vehicle. He flipped upwards landing on the front right side of the bumper; this was the collision that was assumed killed him. "It was surprising" friends and family said. Jeff was 52 years old and has been racing most of his life, from Granite Falls, North Carolina, he was experienced. The event was "unsanctioned," without requiring a roll cage (which is required in the NHRA if a car exceeds ).

Lap Records

As of March 2023, the fastest official race lap records on the NOLA Motorsports Park are listed as:

Maps

References

External links

Motorsport venues in Louisiana
Motorsport in New Orleans
IndyCar Series tracks
Buildings and structures in Jefferson Parish, Louisiana
2011 establishments in Louisiana
Sports venues completed in 2011